The sphenoid sinus is a paired paranasal sinus occurring within the body of the sphenoid bone. It represents one pair of the four paired paranasal sinuses. The pair of sphenoid sinuses are separated in the middle by a septum of sphenoid sinuses. Each sphenoid sinus communicates with the nasal cavity via the opening of sphenoidal sinus. The two sphenoid sinuses vary in size and shape, and are usually asymmetrical.

Anatomy

On average, a sphenoid sinus measures 2.2 cm vertical height, 2 cm in transverse breadth; and 2.2 cm antero-posterior depth.

Each spehoid sinus is contained within the body of sphenoid bone, being situated just inferior to the sella turcica. The two sphenoid sinuses are separated medially by the septum of sphenoidal sinuses (which is usually asymmetrical).

An opening of sphenoidal sinus forms a passage between each sphenoidal sinus, and the nasal cavity. Posteriorly, an opening of sphenoidal sinus opens into the sphenoidal sinus by an aperture high on the anterior wall the sinus; anteriorly, an opening of sphenoidal sinus opens into the roof of the nasal cavity via an aperture on the posterior wall of the sphenoethmoidal recess (occurring just superior the choana).

Innervation
The mucous membrane receives sensory innervation from the posterior ethmoidal nerve (branch of the ophthalmic nerve (CN V1)), and branches of the maxillary nerve (CN V2). 

Postganglionic parasympathetic fibers of the facial nerve that synapsed at the pterygopalatine ganglion control mucus secretion.

Anatomical relations 
Proximal structures include: the optic canal and optic nerve, internal carotid artery, cavernous sinus, trigeminal nerve, pituitary gland, and the anterior ethmoidal cells.

Anatomical variation 
The sphenoid sinuses vary in size and shape, and, owing to the lateral displacement of the intervening septum of sphenoid sinuses, are rarely symmetrical.

When exceptionally large, the sphenoid sinuses may extend into the roots of the pterygoid processes or greater wings of sphenoid bone, and may invade the basilar part of the occipital bone.

The septum of the sphenoidal sinuses may be partially or completely absent. Additional incomplete septa may also be present.

Development
The sphenoidal sinuses are minute at birth; their main development takes place after puberty.

Clinical significance
The spehnoid sinuses cannot be palpated during an extraoral examination.

A potential complication of sphenoidal sinusitis is cavernous sinus thrombosis.

If a fast-growing tumor erodes the floor of the sphenoidal sinus, the vidian nerve could be in danger. If the tumor spreads laterally, the cavernous sinus and all its constituent nerves could be in danger.

An endonasal surgical procedure called a sphenoidotomy may be carried out to enlarge the sphenoid sinus, usually in order to drain it.

Transsphenoidal surgery

Because only thin shelves of bone separate the sphenoidal sinuses from the nasal cavities below and hypophyseal fossa above, the pituitary gland can be surgically approached through the roof of the nasal cavities by first passing through the anterioinferior aspect of the sphenoid bone and into the sinuses, followed by entry through the top of the sphenoid bone into the hypophyseal fossa.

References

External links
 
 

Bones of the head and neck